Oderikhino is a rural locality (a village) in Kolokshanskoye Rural Settlement, Sobinsky District, Vladimir Oblast, Russia. The population was 85 as of 2010. There are 3 streets.

Geography 
Oderikhino is located 21 km northeast of Sobinka (the district's administrative centre) by road. Energetik is the nearest rural locality.

References 

Rural localities in Sobinsky District
Vladimirsky Uyezd